Antennablennius is a genus of combtooth blennies found in the Indian Ocean, largely in the western regions.

Species
There are currently nine recognized species in this genus:
 Antennablennius adenensis Fraser-Brunner, 1951 (Aden blenny)
 Antennablennius australis Fraser-Brunner, 1951 (Moustached rockskipper)
 Antennablennius bifilum (Günther, 1861) (Horned rockskipper)
 Antennablennius ceylonensis Bath, 1983
 Antennablennius hypenetes (Klunzinger, 1871) (Arabian blenny)
 Antennablennius sexfasciatus (von Bonde, 1923)
 Antennablennius simonyi (Steindachner, 1902) (Simony's blenny)
 Antennablennius variopunctatus (Jatzow & Lenz, 1898) (Orange-dotted blenny)
 Antennablennius velifer  J.L.B. Smith, 1959

References

 
Salarinae
Taxa named by Henry Weed Fowler